Moussa Sangare (born 11 January 1958) is a Malian boxer. He competed in the men's bantamweight event at the 1980 Summer Olympics. At the 1980 Summer Olympics, he lost to Lucky Mutale of Zambia.

References

External links
 

1958 births
Living people
Malian male boxers
Olympic boxers of Mali
Boxers at the 1980 Summer Olympics
Sportspeople from Bamako
Bantamweight boxers
21st-century Malian people